Fernando Oliveira De Avila (born in Pelotas, Brazil, May 11, 1984) is a Brazilian footballer. He plays in the forward position and his most recent team is the Peruvian Primera División side Ayacucho FC. Oliveira was the 2006 División Intermedia's second leading goal scorer with 11 anotations.

References

External links
 
 Fernando Oliveira at goal.com
 
 
 

1984 births
Living people
Brazilian footballers
Brazilian expatriate footballers
Footballers from Porto Alegre
La Equidad footballers
Deportes Tolima footballers
Envigado F.C. players
General Caballero Sport Club footballers
Categoría Primera A players
Expatriate footballers in Chile
Expatriate footballers in Bolivia
Expatriate footballers in Colombia
Expatriate footballers in Paraguay
Expatriate footballers in Venezuela
Association football forwards